Douglas Garrett Marshall (born February 3, 1977) is an American former professional mixed martial artist. A professional competitor from 2003 until 2014, Marshall has fought in Bellator, Tachi Palace Fights, the Super Fight League, and the Palace Fighting Championship, and the WEC, where he was the Light Heavyweight Champion. 19 of his 26 career bouts have ended via KO.

Background
Born and raised in Visalia, California, Marshall was a star linebacker for his high school football team but was expelled for fighting.

Mixed martial arts career

Independent promotions
When TPF Middleweight Champion David Loiseau pulled out of a TPF 10 fight with Giva Santana due to an undisclosed injury requiring surgery, Marshall stepped in to face Santana in a middleweight non-title bout. He lost via technical submission in the first round.

He next competed on India's Super Fight League's third event, SFL 3, against Zelg Galešić. He lost the fight via KO early in the first round from a flying knee and punches.

Bellator MMA
In November 2012, Marshall made his debut for Bellator. He faced Hawaiian fighter Kala Hose at Bellator 82. He won the fight via knockout at just 22 seconds in the first round.

In January 2013, Bellator announced Marshall as a competitor in the Season Eight Middleweight Tournament. His quarterfinal fight took place at Bellator 89 against Andreas Spang. He won the fight via TKO in the first round. Marshall then faced Sultan Aliev in the semifinals at Bellator 92, He won via split decision.

Having earned his title shot, Marshall faced Alexander Shlemenko on November 22, 2013 at Bellator 109 for the Bellator Middleweight Championship. He lost the fight via KO due to a body shot in the first round. Following the fight, Marshall tested positive for a banned substance and was subsequently fined and banned by the Pennsylvania Athletic Commission until February 7, 2014.

Marshall faced Melvin Manhoef on September 19, 2014 at Bellator 125.

Personal life
Marshall has a son.

Championships and accomplishments
Bellator Fighting Championships
Bellator Season Eight Middleweight Tournament Winner
World Extreme Cagefighting
WEC Light Heavyweight Championship (One time)
Two successful title defenses

Mixed martial arts record

|-
| Loss
| align=center| 18–8
| Melvin Manhoef
| KO (punch)
| Bellator 125
| 
| align=center| 1
| align=center| 1:45
| Fresno, California, United States
| 
|-
| Loss
| align=center| 18–7
| Alexander Shlemenko
| TKO (punch to the body)
| Bellator 109
| 
| align=center| 1
| align=center| 4:28
| Bethlehem, Pennsylvania, United States
| 
|-
| Win
| align=center| 18–6
| Brett Cooper
| KO (punches)
| Bellator 95
| 
| align=center| 1
| align=center| 3:39
| Atlantic City, New Jersey, United States
| 
|-
| Win
| align=center| 17–6
| Sultan Aliev
| Decision (split)
| Bellator 92
| 
| align=center| 3
| align=center| 5:00
| Temecula, California, United States
| 
|-
| Win
| align=center| 16–6
| Andreas Spång
| TKO (punch)
| Bellator 89
| 
| align=center| 1
| align=center| 3:03
| Charlotte, North Carolina, United States
| 
|-
| Win
| align=center| 15–6
| Kala Hose
| KO (punch)
| Bellator 82
| 
| align=center| 1
| align=center| 0:22
| Mt. Pleasant, Michigan, United States
| 
|-
| Loss
| align=center| 14–6
| Zelg Galesic
| KO (flying knee)
| SFL 3
| 
| align=center| 1
| align=center| 0:34
| New Delhi, Delhi, India
| 
|-
| Win
| align=center| 14–5
| Richard Blake
| KO (punch)
| Twilight Fight Night: Numero Uno
| 
| align=center| 1
| align=center| 0:21
| Woodlake, California, United States
| 
|-
| Loss
| align=center| 13–5
| Givanildo Santana
| Technical Submission (rear-naked choke)
| TPF 10: Let The Chips Fall
| 
| align=center| 1
| align=center| 0:29
| Lemoore, California, United States
| 
|-
| Loss
| align=center| 13–4
| Kyacey Uscola
| KO (punches)
| TPF 6: High Stakes
| 
| align=center| 1
| align=center| 3:17
| Lemoore, California, United States
| 
|-
| Win
| align=center| 13–3
| B.J. Lacy
| Submission (rear-naked choke)
| Playboy Fight Night
| 
| align=center| 3
| align=center| 1:35
| Visalia, California, United States
| 
|-
| Win
| align=center| 12–3
| Keith Berry
| KO (punches)
| PURECOMBAT: Fearless
| 
| align=center| 1
| align=center| 4:41
| Tulare, California, United States
| 
|-
| Win
| align=center| 11–3
| Jaime Jara
| Decision (split)
| PFC 13: Validation
| 
| align=center| 3
| align=center| 3:00
| Lemoore, California, United States
| 
|-
| Win
| align=center| 10–3
| Rafael Real
| TKO (punches)
| PFC 11: All In
| 
| align=center| 1
| align=center| 1:09
| Lemoore, California, United States
| 
|-
| Win
| align=center| 9–3
| Phil Collins
| TKO (punches)
| PFC 9: The Return
| 
| align=center| 2
| align=center| 0:40
| Lemoore, California, United States
| 
|-
| Loss
| align=center| 8–3
| Brian Stann
| TKO (punches)
| WEC 33: Marshall vs. Stann
| 
| align=center| 1
| align=center| 1:35
| Las Vegas, Nevada, United States
| 
|-
| Win
| align=center| 8–2
| Ariel Gandulla
| Submission (armbar) 
| WEC 31
| 
| align=center| 1
| align=center| 0:55
| Las Vegas, Nevada, United States
| 
|-
| Win
| align=center| 7–2
| Justin McElfresh
| KO (punch) 
| WEC 27
| 
| align=center| 1
| align=center| 2:16
| Las Vegas, Nevada, United States
| 
|-
| Win
| align=center| 6–2
| Lodune Sincaid
| TKO (punches)
| WEC 23
| 
| align=center| 2
| align=center| 0:51
| Lemoore, California, United States
| 
|-
| Win
| align=center| 5–2
| Jeff Terry
| TKO (punches)
| WEC 22
| 
| align=center| 1
| align=center| 1:50
| Lemoore, California, United States
| 
|-
| Loss
| align=center| 4–2
| Tim McKenzie
| TKO (punches and elbows)
| WEC 19: Undisputed
| 
| align=center| 1
| align=center| 3:35
| Lemoore, California, United States
| 
|-
| Loss
| align=center| 4–1
| James Irvin
| KO (knee)
| WEC 15
| 
| align=center| 2
| align=center| 0:45
| Lemoore, California, United States
| 
|-
| Win
| align=center| 4–0
| Carlos Garcia
| KO (punches)
| WEC 12
| 
| align=center| 1
| align=center| 2:46
| Lemoore, California, United States
| 
|-
| Win
| align=center| 3–0
| Anthony Arria
| Submission (armbar)
| WEC 10
| 
| align=center| 1
| align=center| 0:22
| Lemoore, California, United States
| 
|-
| Win
| align=center| 2–0
| Lavar Johnson
| TKO (corner stoppage)
| WEC 9
| 
| align=center| 1
| align=center| 5:00
| Lemoore, California, United States
| 
|-
| Win
| align=center| 1–0
| Anthony Fuller
| TKO (submission to punches)
| WEC 8
| 
| align=center| 1
| align=center| 0:32
| Lemoore, California, United States
|

See also
 List of Bellator MMA alumni

References

External links

American male mixed martial artists
American sportspeople in doping cases
Doping cases in mixed martial arts
Mixed martial artists from California
Middleweight mixed martial artists
Light heavyweight mixed martial artists
Mixed martial artists utilizing Muay Thai
Mixed martial artists utilizing Brazilian jiu-jitsu
World Extreme Cagefighting champions
1977 births
Living people
American practitioners of Brazilian jiu-jitsu
American Muay Thai practitioners
People from Visalia, California